Provident Hospital of Cook County (formerly Provident Hospital and Training School) is a public hospital in Chicago, Illinois that was founded as the first African-American-owned and operated hospital in America. Provident was established in 1891 by Dr. Daniel Hale Williams, an African-American surgeon, during the time in American history where few medical facilities were open to African Americans.  It became a public hospital in 1993, and is now part of the Cook County public health system.

History 
It was founded to provide health care and medical training. Its initial officers were president John M. Brown, vice president Richard Mason Hancock, treasurer John T. Jenifer, secretary Louis H. Reynolds, and auditor Lloyd Wheeler.

Owned and run by African Americans, from its start Provident was open to all regardless of race. "[It was] the first private hospital in the State of Illinois to provide internship opportunities for black physicians . . .[t]he first to establish a school of nursing to train black women . . . one of the first black hospitals to provide postgraduate courses and residencies for black physicians and the first black hospital approved by the American College of Surgeons for full graduate training in surgery. Provident also offered an important forum, a proving ground for ideas about black self determination and institutional survival."In 1893, the first documented heart surgery was performed by Dr. Daniel Williams at Provident Hospital and Training School. 

Though the historic Provident Hospital was forced to close in 1987 due to financial difficulties, it reopened in 1993 as part of Cook County Hospital System. to provide services to residents of Chicago's South Side. It is now known as Provident Hospital of Cook County.

Notable people 

 Alton Abraham, the social entrepreneur associated with Sun Ra, worked at Provident.
 Michelle Obama was born at Provident in 1964.

See also
Roscoe Conkling Giles
Anderson Ruffin Abbott Canadian born doctor, surgeon in chief (1894-1896) and Superintendent (1896-1897) at Provident

References

Hospitals in Chicago
Defunct hospitals in Illinois
Historically black hospitals in the United States
African-American history in Chicago
Public hospitals in the United States